Jack Bender (born September 25, 1949) is an American television and film director,  television producer and actor best known for his work as a director on Lost, The Sopranos and Game of Thrones.

Biography
Bender grew up in a secular Jewish family in Los Angeles. His father was a furrier to the Hollywood community. He studied art with Los Angeles artist Martin Lubner (spouse of actress Joanna Merlin) and then went into acting "because it seemed like what I could do and make a living." As an actor, Bender guest-starred on All in the Family, The Bob Newhart Show and The Mary Tyler Moore Show. He co-starred in The Million Dollar Duck, Savage and McNaughton's Daughter. He then went into directing, working on  a number of television series.

He directed the popular slasher film Child's Play 3 before becoming an executive producer and lead director on the ABC TV series Lost, directing 38 episodes of the show, including the series finale. Bender has also directed on other popular shows such as The Sopranos, Carnivàle, Alias and Boston Public. In recent years he was an executive producer and lead director on the TV series Under the Dome (2013) and The Last Ship (2014–15). In 2016, Bender directed the fifth and sixth episodes of the sixth season of Game of Thrones, followed by a limited TV series adaptation of Stephen King's novel Mr. Mercedes.

Bender received nominations for the Primetime Emmy Award for Outstanding Directing for a Drama Series for his direction of the Lost episodes "Live Together, Die Alone", "Through the Looking Glass" and the series finale "The End". He was also nominated for the Game of Thrones episode "The Door".

Family/Personal life
Bender is married to Rabbi Laura Owens of B’nai Horin of Los Angeles.  They have two daughters, Hannah and Sophie Owens-Bender.

Director

Eight Is Enough (1977) TV series
The Paper Chase (1978) TV series
A Real Naked Lady (1980)
Falcon Crest (1981) TV series
Fame (1982) TV series
King's Crossing (1982) TV series
In Love with an Older Woman (1982) (TV)
Two Kinds of Love (1983) (TV film)
Shattered Vows (1984) (TV)
Deadly Messages (1985) (TV)
Letting Go (1985) (TV)
The Midnight Hour (1985) (TV)
Side by Side (1988) (TV)
Tricks of the Trade (1988/I) (TV)
Charlie (1989) (TV)
My Brother's Wife (1989) (TV)
Northern Exposure (1990) TV series
Beverly Hills, 90210 (1990) TV series
Episode "The Game Is Chicken"
Episode "Home and Away"
Episode "Sentenced to Life"
The Dreamer of Oz (1990) (TV film)
The Perfect Tribute (1991) (TV film)
Child's Play 3 (1991)
Love Can Be Murder (1992) (TV film)
Ned Blessing: The Story of My Life and Times (1993) TV series
Armed and Innocent (1994) (TV movie)
Gambler V: Playing for Keeps (1994) (TV film)
Family Album (1994) (TV film)
Lone Justice 2 (1995)
New York News (1995) TV Series
Nothing Lasts Forever (1995) (miniseries)
A Face to Die For (1996) (TV)
Sweet Dreams (1996) (TV film)
Profiler (1996) TV series
Episode "Cycle Of Violence"
Episode "It Cuts Both Ways"
Episode "Modus Operandi"
Episode "Old Acquaintance"
Friends 'Til the End (1997) (TV film)
Killing Mr. Griffin (1997) (TV film)
A Call to Remember (1997) (TV movie)
Felicity (1998) TV series
Episode 2.21 "The Aretha Theory"
Episode 2.23 "The Biggest Deal There Is"
Episode 3.02 "The Anti-Natalie Intervention"
The Tempest (1998) (TV film)
The Sopranos (1999) TV series
Episode 3.05 "Another Toothpick"
Episode 3.10 "...To Save Us All from Satan's Power"
Episode 4.04 "The Weight"
Episode 6.03 "Mayham"
It Came from the Sky (1999) (TV)
Judging Amy (1999) TV series
Episode 1.02 "Short Calendar"
Episode 1.15 "Culture Clash"
Episode 1.17 "Drawing the Line"
Episode 2.09 "The Undertow"
Episode 2.16 "Everybody Falls Down"
Episode 3.02 "Off the Grid"
My Little Assassin (1999) (TV film)
The David Cassidy Story (2000) (TV film)
That's Life (2000) TV series
Boston Public (2000) TV series
Alias (2001) TV series
Episode 1.07 "Color-Blind"
Episode 1.10 "Spirit"
Episode 1.12 "The Box, Part 1"
Episode 1.13 "The Box, Part 2"
Episode 2.13 "Phase One"
Episode 3.03 "Reunion"
Episode 3.07 "Prelude"
Episode 3.10 "Remnants"
Episode 3.15 "Façade"
Episode 3.18 "Unveiled"
Episode 3.20 "Blood Ties"
Presidio Med (2002) TV series
Episode "Breathless"
Boomtown (2002) TV Series (episode "Blackout")
The Lone Ranger (2003) (TV film)
Carnivàle (2003) TV series
Episode 1.09 "Insomnia"
Episode 2.02 "Alamogordo, NM"
Joan of Arcadia (2003) TV series
The Lyon's Den (2003) TV series
Lost (2004–2010) TV series
Episode 1.03 "Tabula Rasa"
Episode 1.04 "Walkabout"
Episode 1.07 "The Moth"
Episode 1.12 "Whatever the Case May Be"
Episode 1.16 "Outlaws"
Episode 1.23 "Exodus: Part 1"
Episode 1.24/1.25 "Exodus: Part 2"
Episode 2.01 "Man of Science, Man of Faith"
Episode 2.03 "Orientation"
Episode 2.12 "Fire and Water"
Episode 2.15 "Maternity Leave"
Episode 2.18 "Dave"
Episode 2.23/2.24 "Live Together, Die Alone"
Episode 3.01 "A Tale of Two Cities"
Episode 3.05 "The Cost of Living"
Episode 3.08 "Flashes Before Your Eyes"
Episode 3.13 "The Man from Tallahassee"
Episode 3.16 "One of Us"
Episode 3.22/3.23 "Through the Looking Glass"
Episode 4.01 "The Beginning of the End"
Episode 4.03 "The Economist"
Episode 4.05 "The Constant"
Episode 4.09 "The Shape of Things to Come"
Episode 4.13/4.14 "There's No Place Like Home, Part 2"
Episode 5.02 "The Lie"
Episode 5.07 "The Life and Death of Jeremy Bentham"
Episode 5.09 "Namaste"
Episode 5.13 "Some Like It Hoth"
Episode 5.16/5.17 "The Incident"
Episode 6.01/6.02 "LA X"
Episode 6.05 "Lighthouse"
Episode 6.08 "Recon"
Episode 6.11 "Happily Ever After"
Episode 6.14 "The Candidate"
Episode 6.17/6.18 "The End"
Alcatraz (2012) TV series
Episode 1.02 "Ernest Cobb"
Episode 1.03 "Kit Nelson"
Episode 1.10 "Clarence Montgomery"
Episode 1.11 "Webb Porter"
Under the Dome (2013) TV series
Episode 1.02 "The Fire"
Episode 1.05 "Blue on Blue"
Episode 1.08 "Thicker Than Water"
Episode 1.13 "Curtains"
Episode 2.01 "Heads Will Roll"
Episode 2.06 "In the Dark"
Episode 2.08 "Awakening"
Episode 2.11 "Black Ice"
Episode 2.13 "Go Now"
The Last Ship (2014) TV series
Episode 1.02 "Welcome to Gitmo"
Episode 1.03 "Dead Reckoning"
Episode 1.04 "We'll Get There"
Episode 1.09 "Trials"
Episode 2.01 "Unreal City"
Episode 2.02 "Fight the Ship"
Episode 2.05 "Achilles"
Episode 2.13 "A More Perfect Union"
Game of Thrones (2016) TV series
Episode 6.5 "The Door"
Episode 6.6 "Blood of My Blood"

References

External links

American film directors
American television directors
American television producers
Jewish American male actors
Living people
University of Southern California alumni
1949 births
21st-century American Jews